The Videos were a short-lived American Doo-wop group.  The group was formed in 1957 by five individuals who were each seventeen years old.
 Charles Baskerville (second tenor)
 Clarence Bassett (first tenor), previously with The Five Sharps
 Ronald Cussey (often given as Cuffey) (lead, second tenor), previously with The Five Sharps
 Johnny Jackson (baritone), previously with The Five Sharps
 Ronnie Woodhall (lead, bass)

Performing a cover of The Orioles' "At Night" at Amateur Night at the Apollo Theater, the group came to the attention of WWRL disk-jockey Jocko Henderson via Sid Wick. Hendrson arranged a record deal with Philadelphia's Casino Records, and their first release "Trickle Tricke" is considered a doo-wop classic.  The record did not chart on Billboard, but did hit #90 on Cashbox.  Before the next single could be recorded, Ronald Cussey had been diagnosed with leukemia and Ronnie Woodhall had died. With a lead singer and a second tenor gone the group had ended before any momentum could be established. Charles Baskerville and Clarence Bassett then became members of Shep and the Limelites.

References

Doo-wop groups
Musical groups established in 1957